The 2009 World Table Tennis Championships men's doubles was the 50th edition of the men's doubles championship.

Wang Hao and Chen Qi won the title after defeating Ma Long and Xu Xin in the final by four sets to one.

Seeds 

  Chen Qi /  Wang Hao (champions)
  Ma Long /  Xu Xin (final)
  Seiya Kishikawa /  Jun Mizutani (semifinals)
  Cheung Yuk /  Li Ching (quarterfinals, retired)
  Oh Sang Eun /  Ryu Seung Min (quarterfinals)
  Gao Ning /  Yang Zi (quarterfinals)
  Jiang Tianyi /  Tang Peng (quarterfinals)
  Hao Shuai /  Zhang Jike (semifinals)
  Zoran Primorac /  Roko Tošić (third round)
  Chen Weixing /  Robert Gardos (first round)
  Chuang Chih-Yuan /  Wu Chih-Chi (second round)
  Slobodan Grujić /  Aleksandar Karakašević (first round)
  Lucjan Błaszczyk /  Wang Zeng Yi (third round)
  Dimitrij Ovtcharov /  Bastian Steger (third round)
  Pär Gerell /  Jens Lundqvist (second round)
  Jörgen Persson /  Robert Svensson (third round)

Final Rounds

Early Rounds

Section 1

Section 2

Section 3

Section 4

References

- Mens Doubles, 2009 World Table Tennis Championships